The 14th Street Limited Line, designated Route 59, is a limited stop peak hour-only MetroExtra bus route operated by the Washington Metropolitan Area Transit Authority between Takoma station which is served by the Red Line of the Washington Metro and Federal Triangle station which is served by the Orange, Blue, and Silver lines of the Washington Metro. The line operates every 15 minutes during rush hours and trips are roughly 50 minutes. This line provides additional service during peak hours along the 14th Street corridor supplementing routes 52 and 54.

Background
Route 59 provides limited stop service along the 14th Street corridor supplementing routes 52 and 54. The route operates in both directions during rush hours serving 18 stops southbound and 19 stops northbound. Route 59 currently operates out of Bladensburg garage. Prior to 2019, route 59 would operate out of Northern division before being closed due to structural problems.

Route 59 Stops

History

The 14th Street Line run by routes 52 and 54 are one of the most heavily used routes in the Metrobus system with about 15,000 riders use these buses on a typical weekday. Those routes connects Takoma station to Downtown Washington DC via 14th Street. However, the routes suffers from crowding, delays, traffic, and ineffectiveness due to the routes having at least 26 stops and frequency of buses are at least 20 minutes. This leads to residents opting for the more efficient 16th Street buses (the S1, S2 and S9).

The idea for a 14th Street express line came as far back as 2012. In 2011, WMATA teamed up with the DC Department of Transportation to study the 14th Street corridor with the biggest conclusion being an express service. The study concluded that express bus service on the 14th Street line (it called express service “limited-stop bus service”) would benefit riders:

The advantages to this proposal are that this service would not only enhance route capacity, but would also improve service frequencies at bus stops served by the limited stop service (service frequency at local-only stops would not be impacted). It would also reduce travel times for passengers able to utilize the bus stops that would be served by the limited stop service. The primary disadvantage is that this proposal would likely incur additional operating costs.

WMATA also recommended extending route 53 from McPherson Square station up to G street running more service north of Colorado Avenue NW, and extending service to the Waterfront area, as well as giving riders better information, doing more to enforce parking restrictions, using articulated buses and training bus operators specifically for the lines they drive.

However, the proposal could not find enough support in previous city budget negotiations, and the idea was scrapped. Since 2012, the 14th Street corridor began to grow even more with businesses in the area nearly doubling from 7,371 in 2011, to 13,992 in 2015.

Proposed New Route
The proposal came back between 2016 and 2017 due to the increased ridership along 14th Street and due to more political support. 

During WMATA's FY2018 budget, it was proposed for the 14th Street limited stop route to be called Route 59 which would operate a limited stop segment between Takoma station and Federal Triangle station replacing route 54's routing between Metro Center station and Federal Triangle as a respond to requests by the District of Columbia and District Department of Transportation. The route will be implemented as soon as December 2017 if passed.

Many residents and local leaders were in favored for the new limited stop service and pushed the DC Council to fund for the new route. The proposal was endorsed by several Advisory Neighborhood Commissions in the 14th Street corridor to respond to growing development activity and passenger crowding on local service.

Ward 4 Council member Brandon Todd stated on the 59 proposal:

I strongly support the creation of an express bus line on 14th street. With increased residential and commercial development along that corridor, there has never been a more important time to make this critical investment in our transportation network…Ward 4 cannot wait any longer for more robust and efficient transportation options.

Ward 1 Council member Brianne Nadeau, a 52 and 54 bus rider herself, has also pledged early support:

As the population along 14th Street continues to grow, it’s vital that we provide additional service in this well-utilized corridor… Access to reliable bus service is essential for District residents, and express service on other bus lines has provided relief to those who rely on transit to get around the city.

At-large Council members Robert White, Elissa Silverman, and David Grosso, along with Ward 6's Charles Allen, have also said they support the new bus service.

As an up-town resident far from a Metro station myself,” says White, “I know the 59 bus could offer critical economic, transit and environmental benefits to our residents and neighborhoods and is the closest we can get to bus rapid transit right now.

Funding would still need to be approved with mayor Bowser submitting her budget proposal and the DC Council will debate and amend it before a final approval in late spring.

On March 29, 2017, DC Mayor Muriel Bowser announced funding for additional service along 14th Street.

On June 13, 2017, the DC Council and DC Mayor Muriel Bowser approved WMATA's FY2018 budget (a $1.2 million budget) which includes the new limited stop route along 14th Street. Councilmembers who publicly advocated in favor of 59 funding include Brianne Nadeau, Brandon Todd, Jack Evans, Elissa Silverman, David Grosso, Charles Allen, and Robert White. The new route will begin in December 2017 to ease out the overcrowding already on routes 52, 53, and 54.

Route Implication
In December 2017, WMATA announced that route 59 will begin service on January 8, 2018. The new route 59 will operate between Takoma station and Federal Triangle station along the 14th Street corridor making limited stops every 15 minutes during weekday rush hours only between 6:30-9:30 AM and 3:45-7:00 PM. Route 59 will enhance route capacity and also improve service frequencies at stops served by the limited-stop bus.

In the process of the new route 59, route 52 was extended to Southwest Waterfront discontinuing service along D street, route 53 was discontinued and replaced by route 54, and route 54 was shorten to Metro Center with Federal Triangle service replaced by route 59. All the changes happened on December 17, 2017 while route 59 began service on January 8, 2018.

The launch of route 59 was met with positives from 14th street residents, council members, and riders on its first day. DC Mayor Muriel Bowser held a press conference with riders following the inaugural ride from Takoma station. After Mayor Bowser ride, she stated;

Safe and reliable public transportation makes it easier for residents to get to work, school, and beyond. The 14th Street corridor has seen substantial economic development and growth, making it one of the most heavily traveled corridors in the District. As the District continues to grow, we’re going to continue finding ways to make it easier for our residents to share in our prosperity.

The route was successful on its first day and helped out routes 52 and 54 from overcrowding and delays.

Changes
In 2019 during WMATA's FY2021 year, WMATA proposed to give route 59 daily service in order to replace route 54. Route 59 will operate every 8 minutes during peak hours and during the same span as route 54 during off peak hours and weekends. However, the route will become a local route between 14th and Colorado and Takoma station serving all stops in between the two points. This was due to the following reasons:
 To streamline service and simplify the route structure making service easier for customers to understand.
 To provide all-day, 7-day-a-week limited-stop service on 14th Street to complement DDOT's planned 14th Street bus priority projects in Columbia Heights.
 To maintain frequent service on upper 14th Street north of Colorado Avenue, Aspen Street and Butternut Street, where there is one travel lane in each direction and it is difficult for MetroExtra buses to pass local buses.
About 4,800 riders board Route 52 or 54 local service at stops south of 14th Street & Colorado Avenue that are not served by route 59, which would see a 50% reduction in frequency of local service. This is approximately 38% of the total 12,800 riders that board all 52, 54 buses on an average weekday according to WMATA. Approximate frequency at stops south of Colorado Avenue would be as follows:

If the proposals were to gone through, routes 52 and 59 would be the only two routes running along the 14th Street Corridor. However, WMATA later backed out the proposals due to customer pushback on April 2, 2020.

All Route 59 service was suspended during the COVID-19 pandemic. The route would later resume on August 23, 2020.

In February 2021 during the FY2022 budget, WMATA proposed to eliminate the 59 if they do not get any federal funding.

References

2017 establishments in Washington, D.C.
2018 establishments in Washington, D.C.
59
Street railways in Washington, D.C.